Denville is an active commuter railroad train station in Denville Township, Morris County, New Jersey. Located on Estling Road, the station contains three side platforms–two curved low-level platforms that service New Jersey Transit's Morristown Line, and a third that services their Montclair-Boonton Line. Both platforms on the Morristown Line contain miniature high-level platforms for handicap accessibility. Trains on both lines operate between Hoboken Terminal, New York Penn Station and Hackettstown. Heading westbound, the next station is Dover while the next station east on the Morristown Line is Mount Tabor. The next station east on the Montclair-Boonton Line is Mountain Lakes. 

Railroad service in Denville began with the opening of the extension of the Morris and Essex Railroad to Rockaway from Morristown on July 4, 1848, with the extension to Dover opening just 27 days later. At the time, the line went due north the current station, running via Rockaway Township to reach Dover. As a result, the original Denville station was on Route 53 in Denville rather than its current location. The Delaware, Lackawanna and Western Railroad opened its then-freight-only Boonton Branch on September 5, 1867.

In 1903, the railroad eliminated the crossing between the Morris and Essex Railroad and Boonton Branches, re-designing it into a wye. At this time, the railroad built a new wooden station depot in the wye. Service via Rockaway was reduced to a branch line the railroad would discontinue on October 18, 1948. Electrification of the station came on January 22, 1931 when service between Dover and Hoboken began via Morristown. The station depot caught fire on September 21, 1991.

History 

Prior to the electrification of the Morristown Line in the 1930s, Morristown line trains crossed the Boonton Branch at a right angle, just east of Denville Tower, and continued northwesterly toward Rockaway.  From Rockaway, the trains headed southwesterly into Dover. As part of the electrification project, the Morristown line was curved westward and joined the Boonton line in its present location. The track segment between Denville and Rockaway saw limited service after the 1930s, with service on the Rockaway Branch ending on October 18, 1948. Interstate 80 now occupies a short portion of the right-of-way. The New Jersey State Historic Preservation Office considered adding the station to their historic building list, however this never went through and the station was demolished in 1992 after a fire on September 21, 1991. Denville Tower was given consideration, twice, once in 1978 and again in 1999, but has yet to join the State Register of Historic Places or National Register of Historic Places.

Station layout
The Montclair–Boonton Line has one track and one low-level side platform serving inbound trains during the morning rush and outbound trains in the evening rush. The Morristown Line has two tracks, each with a mini-high and low-level side platform. The three tracks merge into two just west of the station.

See also 
Boonton Branch

Bibliography

References

External links 

Denville Township, New Jersey
NJ Transit Rail Operations stations
Former Delaware, Lackawanna and Western Railroad stations
Railway stations in the United States opened in 1848
1848 establishments in New Jersey